Anthene aurobrunnea is a butterfly in the family Lycaenidae. It is found on the highlands of Ethiopia.

References

Butterflies described in 1932
Anthene
Endemic fauna of Ethiopia
Butterflies of Africa